Urban golf is a game, based on the original game of golf, in which individual players or teams hit a ball into a hole or at a specified target using various clubs. Urban golf is played without a traditional golf course, instead using street furniture as obstacles and targets. Instead of a standard golf ball, players may use a leather ball.

See also
 Golf glossary
 Golf instruction
 Nineteenth hole
 Word golf
 Wiffle golf

References

 Katu's Keep Portland Weird Top 3 Events
 Good Magazine Video
 Flux Magazine

External links
 New York Times article

Forms of golf